Ida Panovna Mandenova (Ида Пановна Манденова) (26 July 1907 - 4 September 1995) was a Soviet/Georgian botanist and taxonomist noted for studying and describing Heracleum. She described at least 90 plants.

References 

1909 births
1995 deaths
Soviet women scientists
Soviet botanists